Tore Hansen (born 6 February 1978) is a Norwegian football referee and former footballer and football coach.

Career

As player
Tore Hansen played as a midfielder for Mandalskameratene in 2000–2004 and 2006–2008. He also had several spells in English football, playing for amateur clubs Worksop Town and Ossett Town. In 2004 he was trial at Sheffield Wednesday. He retired after the 2008 season and became assistant coach and later head coach in Mandalskameratene. He left his position as head coach in June 2009 to focus on refereeing.

As referee
Hansen began refereeing in 2006, and made his referee debut in the seventh tier in 6. divisjon, the Norwegian football league system. Hansen was refereeing in 3. divisjon between 2007 and 2009 and was a 2. divisjon referee from 2009 to 2010. He made his first appearance in the 1. divisjon (second tier) in 2010 and his Eliteserien debut on 18 September 2011. He became a FIFA referee in 2013. In 2016, Hansen was awarded the Referee of the Year award and refereed the 2016 Norwegian Football Cup Final.

References

External links
 Norsk internasjonals fotballstatistikk (Norwegian international football statistics) - Tore Hansen

1978 births
Living people
Norwegian footballers
Mandalskameratene players
Norwegian First Division players
Norwegian football referees
Association football midfielders